Ketil Børde (3 February 1935 – 27 February 2022) was a Norwegian civil servant and diplomat.

He was born in Oslo, is a political scientist by education and was hired in the Ministry of Foreign Affairs in 1959. He became deputy under-secretary of state there in 1981 before serving as Norway's ambassador to Switzerland from 1985 to 1989. Following a period as special adviser in the Ministry of Foreign Affairs from 1991 to 1994, he was Norway's ambassador to Sweden from 1994 to 2000.

References

1935 births
2022 deaths
People from Oslo
Norwegian civil servants
Ambassadors of Norway to Switzerland
Ambassadors of Norway to Sweden